In the small wavelength limit, the total scattering cross-section of an impenetrable sphere is twice its geometrical cross-sectional area (which is the value obtained in classical mechanics).

Several explanations for this phenomenon have been proposed:
destructive interference inside particle shadow
diffraction and shadowing of light by particle
superposition of incident and scattered field
cancellation of incident wave inside particle

References 

Paradoxes